"Come Go with Me" is a 1957 song by the Del-Vikings, also covered by Dion, the Beach Boys, and others.

Come Go with Me may also refer to:

 Come Go with Me (album), a 1966 album by Gloria Jones
 "Come Go with Me" (Pockets song), 1977
 "Come Go with Me" (Exposé song), 1987
 "If You're Ready (Come Go with Me)", a 1973 song by the Staple Singers
 "Come Go with Me", a song by Teddy Pendergrass from Teddy